Ioan Ţepelea was the president of the international Academy of Sciences, Literature and Arts (ASLA), based in Oradea, Romania.

Ţepelea was born on 3 June 1949, in the village of Beznea, near Bratca, Bihor, Romania. He studied history and philosophy at Cluj-Napoca and has written many books about Romania and Europe in general at the time of World War I.

Ioan Ţepelea died on 26 March 2012.

External links
Ioan Tepelea - official biography and list of works from the ASLA site

1949 births
2012 deaths
People from Bihor County
20th-century Romanian poets
Romanian male poets
20th-century Romanian male writers